Janakpurdham or Janakpur is a sub-metropolitan city in Dhanusha District, Madhesh Province, Nepal. The city is a hub for religious and cultural tourism. A headquarter of Dhanusha district, Janakpur is also the capital for Madhesh Province.

The city was founded in the early 12th century. According to tradition and an Archeological evidence found at the site, ancient civilization indicates Janakpurdham as the capital of the Videha dynasty that ruled the Mithila region in ancient times.

, the city had a population of 173,924. The city had a population of 195,438 in 2021. Janakpur is currently the most populated sub metropolitan city of Nepal. Janakpur is located about 23 km away from the Bhitthamore border of India. Nepal Railways operates between Janakpur and Jaynagar of India.

History 

Accounts from ascetics, pandits, and bards indicate that Janakpur was founded in the early 18th century. The earliest description of Janakpur as a pilgrimage site dates to 1805. Earlier archaeological evidence of the presence of an ancient city has not been found. King Janaka's palace is thought to have been located in ancient Janakpur as it is believed to be the capital of the Kingdom of the Videhas. According to Ramayana, he found a baby girl in a furrow, named her Sita, and raised her as his daughter. When she was older, he offered her in marriage to anyone who was able to lift the bow of Shiva, left near Janakpur a thousand years earlier. Many royal suitors tried but only Rama, the prince of Ayodhya, could lift the bow. According to an old song, this bow was found northeast of Janakpur.

Until the 1950s, Janakpur was a cluster of rural hamlets inhabited by farmers, artisans, priests, and clerks who worked for the monasteries that controlled the land. After the Independence Act in India, Janakpur expanded into a commercial center and became the capital of the Dhanusa District in the 1960s.

As Rama and Sita are major figures in Hinduism, Janakpur is an important pilgrimage site for Hindus. According to the first millennium BC text, Shatapatha Brahmana, the Maithil king Videgha Māthava crossed the Sadānirā (Gandaki River), led by his priest Gotama Rahugana, and founded the Kingdom of Videha with Janakpur as the capital city. As Gotama Rahugana composed many hymns of the Rigveda, these events must date to the Regvedic period.

Gautama Buddha and Vardhamana Mahavira, the 24th and final Tirthankara of the Jain religion are said to have lived in Janakpur. The region was an important center for the history of Mithila during the first millennium.

Demographics 

, the Janakpur municipality had 19,195 households and a population of 98,446 people with a density of 4,000 people per square kilometer. In 2015, it was declared a sub-metropolitan city that incorporates 11 surrounding villages. The current population is 173,924 people, making it the sixth largest city in Nepal.

Maithili is widely spoken in the area as the first language and is also used as the lingua franca. Nepali, Hindi, Marwari, and English are well understood. Languages like Bhojpuri and Awadhi are understood but less frequently used.

More than 90 percent of the total population is Hindu, with the rest being Muslims and Buddhists.

Economy 
Janakpur is one of the fastest developing cities of Nepal and is the largest sub-metropolitan city in the country. The city has good health care facilities, a number of parks, private schools, colleges, and internet service providers. There are medical, engineering, and management colleges that are affiliated to Tribhuvan University. The economy is mostly based on tourism, agriculture, and local industries.

The paintings on pottery, walls, and courtyards made by Maithili women are known as Mithila art.

Janakpur attracts migrants from the surrounding area, moving to the city for medical care, education, and jobs. The largest employers were the Janakpur Cigarette Factory Limited and Janakpur Railway until they closed in 2013 due to political corruption and heavy loans.  By the end of 2018 service was resumed. Zonal Hospital, Zonal Police, and the Banking Sector help the locals live a relatively easy lifestyle.

The city has many commercial banks, such as Nepal Rastra Bank, the State Bank of India, Nepal, Everest Bank LTD. Machhapuchhare, NIC Bank, Nepal Bank LTD, and Agriculture Development Bank.

Geography and climate 
Janakpur is located in the Terai, where the climate is humid subtropical: the months of March and April are hot, dry, and windy. The wet season lasts from May to September, followed by mild dry autumn from October to November. It is a cold winter from December to February.

The major rivers surrounding Janakpur are Dudhmati, Jalad, Rato, Balan, and Kamala.

Transport

Roadways 
Frequent bus services operate between Janakpur and Nepalese cities. Within the city, cycle rickshaws, electric rickshaws, tempos (three-wheeled vehicle), and buses are available. A few Bus services operate for Indian cities of Sitamarhi, Patna, Delhi and Ayodhya as part of the Ramayan Circuit to promote religious tourism in Nepal and India.

Railways 

Nepal Railways is the only operational railway in Nepal. It connects Janakpur to Siraha at the Nepal-India border and goes further to the Indian city of Jaynagar, Bihar. There is a customs checkpoint in Siraha for goods.

Airways 

Janakpur has a domestic airport  with most flights connecting to Kathmandu.

Culture

Religious sites 
The Janaki Mandir temple is in the centre of Janakpur, northwest of the market. It is one of the biggest temples in Nepal and was built in 1898 (1955 in the Nepali calendar) by Queen Brisabhanu Kunwari of Tikamgarh. It is also called Nau Lakha Mandir after the cost of construction, said to be nine lakh gold coins. The temple is architecturally unique in Nepal: its inner sanctum contains a flower-covered statue of Sita that was found in the Sarayu near Ayodhya. Statues of Rama and his half-brothers Lakshman, Bharat, and Satrughna stand by Sita.

Adjacent to the Janaki Mandir is the Rama Sita Vivaha Mandir, a building that marks the event in which Rama and Sita were married.

The oldest temple in Janakpur is Sri Ram Temple, built by the Gorkhali General Amar Singh Thapa. Pilgrims also visit the over 200 sacred ponds in the city for ritual baths. The two most important ponds – Dhanush Sagar and Ganga Sagar, are located close to the city center.

Other religious sites
 Vivah Mandap temple is situated next to the Janaki Mandir
 Ram Tower is also next to Janaki Mandir. It was inaugurated by former Prime Minister Sushil Koirala, located to the south of Ram Temple.
 Kapileshwar Temple

Festivals 
Major religious celebrations include the Hindu festivals Vivaha Panchami, Dipawali, and Vijayadashami, followed by Chhath Puja, which is celebrated six days after Diwali and Makar Sankranti.

On the night of the full moon in February and March, before the festival of Holi, a one-day Parikrama (circumambulation) of the city is celebrated. Many people offer prostrated obeisances along the entire  route. Two other festivals honour Rama and Sita: Rama Navami, the birthday of Lord Rama, and the Vivah Panchami that re-enacts the wedding of Rama and Sita at the Vivah Mandap temple on the fifth day of the waxing moon in November or early December.

Education 
Janakpur has educational facilities where several of the country's elites went to school, including the first president of the Federal Republic of Nepal, Ram Baran Yadav. There are many private and government schools and colleges located in Janakpur. The oldest government school for higher studies is Ramsworup Ramsagar Bahumukhi Campus (RR Multiple Campus), which is affiliated with Tribhuvan University. Some of the prominent private colleges are Rajarshi Janak Campus, and Model Multiple College.

Janakpur also has a medical college, Janaki Medical College, which is also affiliated with Tribhuvan University.

Libraries 
Gangasagar Public Library was established in 1955 and is situated between two historical ponds of Janakpur—Dhanuschatra Pond and Ganga Sagar. The library was reopened to the public in 2012. In recent times, a team of active and committed local youth workers has contributed to the revival of this library by organizing public book collections for the library. It is open daily for three hours, mainly for newspaper-reading but has few daily visitors.

Ramswaroop Ramsagar Multiple Campus Library is also accessible to the general public.

Media
The local media of Janakpur primarily consists of several community radio stations, some TV channels, and a few print newspapers, such as Janakpur Today. Local Janakpur media primarily consists of radio shows, such as Mithila Jagaran.

2015 Nepal earthquake 

According to Colin Stark at Columbia University, during the earthquake on 25 April 2015, "[a] part of India slid about one foot to 10 feet northwards and underneath Nepal in a matter of seconds. The part below Bihar slid under Nepal along a zone from Bharatpur, through Hetauda, to Janakpur."

Sister cities 
 Ayodhya, India
 Ayodhya and Janakpur became sister cities in November 2014. Ayodhya is the birthplace of Rama and Janakpur is the birthplace of his consort, Sita.

Gallery

See also

List of cities in Nepal 
Bimalendra Nidhi 
Janakpur–Jaynagar Railway 
2022 Janakpur municipal election

References

External links

Populated places in Dhanusha District
Populated places in Mithila, Nepal
Dhanusha District
Places in the Ramayana
Nepal municipalities established in 1962
Submetropolitan municipalities of Nepal
Nepalese capital cities